Onwards to the Wall is an EP by the Brooklyn-based noise rock band A Place to Bury Strangers, released on February 7, 2012 on the Dead Oceans label.

Reception
According to Metacritic, Onwards to the Wall has an average score of 75 out of 100, indicating that it has received generally favorable reviews from critics.

Track listing
I Lost You
So Far Away
Onwards to the Wall
Nothing Will Surprise Me
Drill it Up

References

A Place to Bury Strangers albums
2012 EPs
Shoegaze EPs
Dead Oceans albums